Arab Buran (also Romanized as ‘Arab Būrān; also known as ‘Arab Būlān) is a village in Yanqaq Rural District in the Central District of Galikash County, Golestan Province, Iran. At the 2006 census, its population was 991, in 211 families.

References 

Populated places in Galikash County